Kokrajhar railway station is a major railway station in Kokrajhar district, Assam. Its code is KOJ. It serves Kokrajhar City. The station consists of three platforms.The station lies on the New Jalpaiguri–New Bongaigaon section of Barauni–Guwahati line of Northeast Frontier Railway. This station falls under Alipurduar railway division.

Trains 

Some of the major trains that runs from  Kokrajhar are :

 New Delhi–Dibrugarh Rajdhani Express
 Howrah–Dibrugarh Kamrup Express
 Dibrugarh–Chandigarh Express
 Anand Vihar–Kamakhya Northeast Express
 Dibrugarh–Kanyakumari Vivek Express
 Guwahati–Bengaluru Cantt. Kaziranga Express
 Kolkata–Guwahati Garib Rath Express
 Silchar-Coimbatore Superfast Express
 Delhi–Dibrugarh Brahmaputra Mail
 Dibrugarh–Lalgarh Avadh Assam Express
 Dr. Ambedkar Nagar–Kamakhya Express
 Alipurduar–Kamakhya Intercity Express
Ranchi–Kamakhya Express
 Udaipur City–Kamakhya Kavi Guru Express
 Bhagat Ki Kothi–Kamakhya Express
 Gandhidham–Kamakhya Express
 Kamakhya Gaya Express
 Dibrugarh - Rajendra Nagar Express
 Tiruvananthapuram-Silchar Aronai Superfast Express
 Dibrugarh–Tambaram Express
 Sealdah–Silchar Kanchanjunga Express
 Sealdah–Agartala Kanchanjunga Express
Kamakhya–Shri Mata Vaishno Devi Katra Express
 Alipurduar–Lumding Intercity Express
Kamakhya–Anand Vihar Express
Lokmanya Tilak Terminus–Guwahati Express (via Katihar)
New Tinsukia–Rajendra Nagar Weekly Express
New Jalpaiguri - Bongaigaon Express

References

External links

Railway stations in Kokrajhar district
Alipurduar railway division